Pretty Wicked is a reality show on the Oxygen Network. The series challenges 10 women to put looks aside and compete to see who is the most beautiful on the inside.  The winner receives a grand prize of $50,000.  The show is hosted by Caridee English, winner of America's Next Top Model.  The girls are judged by three celebrity judges: plus-sized model and published author Mia Tyler, Beverly Hills psychotherapist and radio talk show host Dr. Jenn Berman, and comedian/author Kyle Cease.

Contestants
Host: Caridee English
Judge: Mia Tyler
Judge: Kyle Cease
Judge: Dr. Jenn Berman

Episode progress

 The contestant won Pretty Wicked.
 The contestant was the Runner-Up
 The contestant won immununity from elimination.
 The contestant won the challenge, but did not receive immunity.
 The contestant was safe from elimination.
 The contestant was in the bottom 3.
 The contestant was in the bottom 2.
 The contestant was eliminated.
 The contestant quit the competition.
 The contestant won immunity, but quit the competition.
 The contestant quit, but then returned for elimination and was in the bottom 3.

In Episode 3 Katie, Qui and Reena were chosen as the bottom three, but due to Vanessa's withdrawal, there was no bottom two and none of them went home.
Episodes 7 and 8 were part of the two-hour Season Finale.

Episode review

Episode 1: Mirror Mirror Not On The Wall

Challenge: Talk to blind guys
Challenge Winner/Immunity: Julin
Bottom 3: Reena, Ana, Jillian
Eliminated: Jillian

Episode 2: Sell Your Soul

Challenge: Auction off their stuff
Challenge Winner/Immunity: Team 1 Reena, Qui, and Vanessa but immunity was chosen by Reena and Qui to go to Vanessa.
Quit: Amber (She returned for elimination)
Bottom 3: Amber, Sarah R., Julin
Eliminated: Julin

Episode 3: Slow Roasted

Challenge: Comedy Roast
Challenge Winner/Immunity: Vanessa
Bottom 3: Sarah R., Qui, ReenaQuit: Vanessa

Episode 4: You're it GirlChallenge: Slash Challenge & Interview by Pat O'BrienChallenge Winner/Immunity: Sarah C.Bottom 3: Katie, Amber, QuiEliminated: Qui

Episode 5: In Frenemy Territory Challenge: Fake Rescue Mission
Challenge Winner no one
Bottom 3: Ana, Sarah C., Reena
Eliminated: Reena

Episode 6: The Truth About Lies

Challenge: Lie Detector Test
Challenge Winner: Ana
Bottom 2: Amber, Sarah C.
Eliminated: Amber

Episode 7: Who Wins? (Part 1)

Challenge: Night on the town with aged make-up.
Challenge Winners: Sarah C., Katie
Bottom two: Ana & Sarah R.
Quit: Ana

Episode 8: Who Wins? (Part 2)

Challenge: Watching audition tape then writing a letter to "old" self
Second Runner-Up: Katie
Runner-Up: Sarah R.
Winner: Sarah C.

References

2009 American television series debuts
2010 American television series endings
2000s American reality television series
2010s American reality television series
Oxygen (TV channel) original programming